Thamsanqa Sangweni (born 26 May 1989 in Empangeni, KwaZulu-Natal) is a South African football (soccer) midfielder who last played for TS Sporting.

He is the younger brother of former Orlando Pirates player Siyabonga Sangweni.

Career
In 2017 Sangweni moved from Chippa United to Orlando Pirates on a two year deal, following in his brother's footsteps who had played there for five years.

See also

 List of African association football families

References

External links 

1989 births
Association football midfielders
Living people
South African soccer players
People from Empangeni
AmaZulu F.C. players
Mamelodi Sundowns F.C. players
Cape Town Spurs F.C. players
Orlando Pirates F.C. players
Chippa United F.C. players
Maritzburg United F.C. players
TS Sporting F.C. players
South African Premier Division players
National First Division players
South Africa international soccer players
2015 Africa Cup of Nations players
African Games silver medalists for South Africa
African Games medalists in football
Competitors at the 2011 All-Africa Games